Henry Eugène Pottier (21 February 1912 – 7 September 2000), often erroneously written as Henri Pottier, was a French architect. A disciple of Victor Laloux, he won a Prix de Rome in 1944.
As it was customary to fill the position of Architecte en chef des bâtiments civils et palais nationaux (English: Chief Architect of Civilian Buildings and National Palaces) from among recipients of the award, Pottier ascended to the function in 1968.
An adherent to the Athens Charter, he is perhaps best known to the general public as the chief architect of the Front de Seine, a major 1970s redevelopment in the 15th arrondissement of Paris, and several entertainment facilities in the Principality of Monaco, for whose government he was a consulting architect. He designed many public buildings, first in his native Eure, then in the Paris region during the 1960s and 1970s.

Major works 
 École nationale supérieure des travaux publics, Yamoussoukro, Côte d'Ivoire
 Antoine Béclère Hospital, Clamart, France
 Centre sportif municipal Parc Lagravère, Colombes, France
 Saint-Bernard Chapel, Colombes, France
 Henri Mondor University Hospital, Créteil, France
 Auditorium Maurice-Ravel, Lyon, France
 École Polytechnique, Palaiseau, France
 Embassy of Germany, Paris, France
 New Val-de-Grâce Hospital, Paris, France
 Tour Les Poissons at Le Zodiaque, Courbevoie, France  
 Stade Louis II, Monaco
 Monte-Carlo Sporting, Monaco
 Higher Institute of Mining, Industry and Geology, Niamey, Niger

References

External links
 Fonds Pottier, Henry (1912-2000) at Archiwebture (in French)

1912 births
2000 deaths
People from Eure
20th-century French architects